Ele Opeloge (born July 11, 1985) is a Samoan weightlifter. She was the first Samoan to win an Olympic medal, winning silver in the women's +75 kg category at the 2008 Beijing Olympic Games.

Family
Opeloge comes from a weightlifting family. Her brother, Niusila is also a Commonwealth gold medalist, winning it the same day as her.  Four other relatives have also competed at Commonwealth level. Her twin sister is Larissa Tara. She is the mother of weightlifter Avatu Opeloge.

Career

2007
At the 2007 World Championships she ranked 11th, with a total of 250 kg.

2008
She represented Samoa at the 2008 Summer Olympics in Beijing, competing in the over 75kg category. She was also her country's flagbearer during the Games' opening ceremony.

Opeloge finished fourth in her event, narrowly missing out on a bronze medal. She lifted 269 kg, matching her personal best, while Mariya Grabovetskaya of Kazakhstan lifted 270 kg to finish third.  In August 2016, the IWF reported in the IOC reanalysis of the 2008 Beijing Olympics that the silver and bronze medalists - Olha Korobka of Ukraine, and Mariya Grabovetskaya - failed retests of their doping samples. The IWF later reallocated medals accordingly, elevating Opeloge to become the silver medalist and also the first-ever Olympic medalist from Samoa.

Opeloge is a celebrity in Samoa, "where children approach her in the supermarket for autographs".

2010
Opeloge won a gold at the 2010 Commonwealth Games in New Delhi, India in over 75 kg class with a Games record of 285 kg. It was also Samoa's second gold medal in the history of the Games.

2012
Opeloge took 5th place in the London Olympics.  Her build up to the Olympics were disrupted by chicken pox and typhoid.

2014 
Opeloge was the Samoan flagbearer for the 2014 Commonwealth Games, as well as being one of the baton carriers as the Queen's baton made its way through Samoa.  At the Games she won the silver medal in the +75 kg category.

References

External links
 
 

Living people
1985 births
Samoan female weightlifters
Weightlifters at the 2008 Summer Olympics
Weightlifters at the 2010 Commonwealth Games
Commonwealth Games gold medallists for Samoa
Olympic weightlifters of Samoa
Weightlifters at the 2012 Summer Olympics
Weightlifters at the 2014 Commonwealth Games
Commonwealth Games silver medallists for Samoa
Commonwealth Games medallists in weightlifting
Medalists at the 2008 Summer Olympics
Olympic medalists in weightlifting
Olympic silver medalists for Samoa
Medallists at the 2010 Commonwealth Games
Medallists at the 2014 Commonwealth Games